This is a list of the National Register of Historic Places listings in Saint Louis County, Minnesota.  It is intended to be a complete list of the properties and districts on the National Register of Historic Places in Saint Louis County, Minnesota, United States.  The locations of National Register properties and districts for which the latitude and longitude coordinates are included below, may be seen in an online map.

There are 130 properties and districts listed on the National Register in the county, including three National Historic Landmarks.  A supplementary list includes two additional sites that were formerly on the National Register.

Many of Saint Louis County's listings are associated with the city of Duluth's role as the westernmost port on the Great Lakes, shared with Superior, Wisconsin. The iron ore of the Mesabi Range and the Vermilion Range led to the development of the cities of Chisholm, Hibbing, Virginia, and Ely. Three of the iron mines are National Historic Landmarks: Hull–Rust–Mahoning Open Pit Iron Mine, Mountain Iron Mine, and the underground Soudan Iron Mine.

Current listings

|}

Former listings

|}

See also
 List of National Historic Landmarks in Minnesota
 National Register of Historic Places listings in Minnesota
 National Register of Historic Places listings in Voyageurs National Park

References

External links

 Minnesota National Register Properties Database—Minnesota Historical Society

St. Louis County